See How They Dance is a 2011 French drama film directed by Claude Miller.

Plot
During a journey, the widow Lise gets to know her late husband's lover Alexandra.

Cast
 Marina Hands as Lise Clément
 James Thiérrée as Victor Clément  Vic
 Maya Sansa as Doctor Alexandra Smith a.k.a. Alex
 Yves Jacques as George Bliss
 Anne-Marie Cadieux as Brigitte
 Aubert Pallascio as Antoine Clément
 Normand D'Amour as Lee Atlee
 Stuart Mylow Jr. as Charlie
 Benoît Brière as the lawyer
 Patrick Goyette as Brad

Production
The scene where James Thierrée and Maya Sansa swims in the nude was shot at Lac Sacacomie, Québec, Canada. "The nine-week shoot in Canada was wonderful," Sansa recalls. "But I got hypothermia while shooting this scene. It's funny because at first you don't realize it. I could feel my limbs getting cold. I even thought I had to move as much as possible to warm up. It was exactly the opposite. It could have gone wrong, but it all turned out fine!" - she said with a smile.

References

External links
 

2011 films
2011 drama films
French drama films
2010s French-language films
Films directed by Claude Miller
2010s French films